Bayet is a commune in the Allier department in the Auvergne-Rhône-Alpes region of central France.

The inhabitants of the commune are known as Bayétois or Bayétoises.

Geography
Access to the commune is by the D2009 (former N9) road from Saint-Pourçain-sur-Sioule in the north which passes through the commune east of the village and continues south to Le Mayet-d'École. The D6 branches off the D2009 in the commune and goes south-east to Saint-Didier-la-Forêt. Access to the village is by the D406 which branches off the D2009 in the commune and goes south-west to the village changing to the D519. The D183 goes south from the village to Barberier. The D219 comes from Chareil-Cintrat in the west and passes through the village before continuing east to join the D6. The D35 from Étroussat in the south-west to Saint-Pourcain-sur-Sioule passes through the west of the commune. Apart from the village there are the hamlets of Nerignet, Le Marais, Les Echaloux, La Rue du Jo, Le Plaix, Le Chambon, and Les Bouillots. The commune is almost entirely farmland.

The railway line from La Ferté-Hauterive to Gannat once passed through the commune. It was the last line to have been commissioned by the Chemins de fer de Paris à Lyon et à la Méditerranée in 1932. It was closed to passenger traffic in 1938. The section between the stations of Saint-Pourçain-sur-Sioule and Bayet was closed to freight traffic in 1960 and decommissioned in 1969 followed by a path being created in 1974.

Bayet once had a station on this line. The passenger station was built "midway between the ends of the line, [...] comprising [...] a siding of 700 m length".

The Sioule river flows through the commune from south to north and continues north to join the Allier north-east of Contigny. The Bouble river flows from the west and through the western part of the commune as it flows north-east to join the Sioule on the commune border.

Toponymy
Bayet appears as Bayet on the 1750 Cassini Map and the same on the 1790 version.

History
The former commune of Martilly was merged with Bayet in 1807.

Administration

List of Successive Mayors

Demography
In 2017 the commune had 698 inhabitants.

Distribution of Age Groups

Percentage Distribution of Age Groups in Bayet and Allier Department in 2017

Source: INSEE

Education

Economy

Population and income tax
In 2011, the median household income tax amounted to €26,288, placing Bayet at the 22,612nd ranking of communes with more than 49 households in metropolitan France.

Local taxes applicable in Bayet are: housing tax 8.18%; property tax on built-up properties 8.44%, and Undeveloped properties 33.84%. These rates are unchanged compared in 2014 and in 2013 these figures were lower than the average of the stratum corresponding to communes from 500 to 2000 inhabitants. The community of communes to which Bayet belongs is not eligible for the property tax on buildings however the residential tax rate (10.89%) and the developed property (additional charge: 37.57%) exceed those of the commune.

Employment
In 2012 the population aged 15–64 years was 430 people among which 77% were employable, 66.1% in employment and 10.8% were unemployed.

There were 446 jobs in the employment area. The number of active employed residing in the area being 287, the job concentration indicator is 155.5% which means that the commune offers more than one job per employable person.

Businesses
On 1 January 2013 Bayet had 31 businesses: 10 in industry, 5 in construction, and 16 in trade, transport and other services. There were no businesses in the administrative sector.

Industry
The commune has a Combined cycle gas electricity generator, the 3CB (for Central Combined Cycle Bayet), owned by the Swiss energy company Alpiq. It entered service in 2011 with a capacity of 408 megawatts. It produces annually an average of about 1.6 billion kWh, which is equivalent to the consumption of 400,000 homes. 3CB cost 300 million euros. The installation in Bayet was due to the presence of a major high-voltage RTE substation and a GRTgas pipeline.

The Lucane energy plant, established since 1 April 1982, can "enhance the autonomy of municipal waste for 96000 Bourbonnais". This unit is on track to pass ISO 50001 certification.

Tourism
On 1 January 2015 the commune had no hotels, nor campsites, or any other collective accommodation.

Culture and heritage

Religious heritage
The Church of Saint Marcel (12th century) is registered as an historical monument.

See also
Communes of the Allier department

References

INSEE References 
 Commune of Bayet (03018) - Complete File, consulted on 4 July 2015 :

Communes of Allier